Montreal Kosher, also known as MK Kosher, is a kosher certification agency based in Montreal, Canada. It was founded in 1922 by the Jewish Community Council of Montreal.

References

    

Kosher food certification organizations
Jewish organizations based in Canada
Religious consumer symbols